Definitive Collection is a compilation album recorded by the Electric Light Orchestra (ELO) and produced by Jeff Lynne. It was released on 13 April 1999 with two discs. Some of the songs include their album versions like "Strange Magic" and "Shine a Little Love", and some tracks include edits seen below.

Compilation edits
Many edits are featured in this album. "Can't Get It Out of My Head" has a small portion of "Eldorado Overture" left off on it, "Above the Clouds" is connected with "Livin' Thing" and is not credited on the track listing, "So Fine" leaves a portion of the fade into "Rockaria!", "Turn to Stone" does not include the full fade in of the synthesizer and guitars, part of the tuning radio on "Mr. Blue Sky" is gone, "Twilight" has a fade in from the previous track (on the Time album), "Prologue", the end of "Twilight" and the intro of "Rock 'n' Roll Is King" are transited, and "Secret Messages" has no fade in and goes straight to the backmasking lyrics.

Cover
The front cover of the Definitive Collection is a collage of many different past ELO covers such as, Face the Music, A New World Record, Out of the Blue, one of the pictures in the booklet of Balance of Power, and mostly Secret Messages.

Track listing

Personnel
Jeff Lynne – lead vocals, guitars, keyboards, bass guitar (all tracks)
Richard Tandy – piano, keyboards, synthesizer, backing vocals (all tracks)
Bev Bevan – drums, percussion, backing vocals (all tracks)
Kelly Groucutt – backing vocals, bass guitar (CD 1 - tracks 4–18; CD 2 - tracks 22–25)
Mik Kaminski – violin (CD 1 - tracks 2-9, 11, 17; CD 2 - track 3)
Melvyn Gale – cello (CD 1 - tracks 4–8, 11; CD 2 - track 3)
Hugh McDowell – cello (CD 1 - tracks 4–8, 11; CD 2 - track 3)

Additional
Mike de Albuquerque – bass guitar, backing vocals (CD 1 - track 1, 3; CD 2 - track 2)
Mike Edwards – cello (CD 1 - track 1-3; CD 2 - track 2)
Wilfred Gibson – violin (CD 1 - track 1; CD 2 - track 2)
Roy Wood – cello, bass guitar, wind instruments (CD 2 - track 1)
Colin Walker – cello (CD 1 - track 1)

References

Albums produced by Jeff Lynne
1999 greatest hits albums
Electric Light Orchestra compilation albums